Three ships of the United States Navy have been named Craven after Tunis Craven, a Navy Commander who died at the Battle of Mobile Bay.

 , a torpedo boat, commissioned in 1900 and decommissioned in 1913.
 , a destroyer, commissioned in 1918, served in the Royal Navy as Lewes until being scrapped in 1945.
 , a destroyer, commissioned in 1937 and decommissioned in 1945.

Sources
 

United States Navy ship names